Cornerstone Christian Academy (CCA) of McLean County is a private, non-denominational, college-preparatory Christian school located in Bloomington, Illinois. CCA enrolls preschool through 12th grade.  It has a total enrollment of approximately 470 students.

History
In 1997, the Eastview Christian Church preschool was taken over and renamed "Cornerstone Christian Academy of McLean County, Inc.” by founders Becky Shamess and April Kinzinger. In 1998, Cornerstone moved to Grace United Methodist Church in Bloomington, where it accepted students from preschool through 4th grade. It later expanded to three campuses at Faith United Methodist, which housed the preschool; Grace United Methodist held kindergarten through fourth grade; and Second Presbyterian Church for 5th and 6th grade.  A new building was constructed outside Bloomington after 78 acres were donated to the school and the new building was opened December 1, 2003.  In 2016, a high school addition was completed.  The school has been fully accredited since 2006 by the Association of Christian Schools International (ACSI).

Winterim
Cornerstone offers a program held during the first two weeks of January called Winterim. During this time high school students are allowed to choose from various credit-earning classes not normally taught during the school year, particularly in the arts and industrial technology.  11th and 12th grade students are allowed to select an internship. Students also have the opportunity to travel abroad for study trips during this time.

Athletics
Cornerstone's athletic teams are named the Cyclones, and their school colors are forest green and white.  The school participates in the East Central Illinois Conference, and is a member of the Illinois High School Association (IHSA).

Middle School Sports
 Boys Basketball
 Boys Baseball
 Girls Volleyball
 Cheerleading
 Boys/Girls Cross Country
 Boys/Girls Track
 Girls Basketball

High School Sports
 Girls Volleyball
 Boys/Girls Basketball
 Boys Soccer
 Boys/Girls Cross Country
 Track
 Golf
 Cheerleading
 Baseball
 Softball

School Activities
 Student Council
 School Paper: "The Cornerstone Clarion" (online)
 School Yearbook: "Milestones"
 Drama Club
 Strings
 Scholastic Bowl
 Madrigals
 Pep Band
 Chess Club
 Book Club
 Worship Band

School Membership Associations
 Association of Christian Schools International (ACSI)
 Illinois High School Association (IHSA)
 Illinois Elementary School Association (IESA)

See also
 School Website

Christian schools in Illinois
Private elementary schools in Illinois
Private middle schools in Illinois
Private high schools in Illinois
Schools in Bloomington–Normal
Nondenominational Christian schools in the United States
Preparatory schools in Illinois